Karl Zimmermannn (19 October 1894 – 1 August 1986) was a Swiss sports shooter who won 42 medals from 1921 to 1947, including 19 gold, at the World Shooting Championships.

Biography
He never took part in the Olympic Games.

See also
 World Shooting Championship Multiple Medallist

References

External links
 Karl Zimmermann profile at ISSF web siye

1894 births
1986 deaths
Swiss male sport shooters
ISSF pistol shooters
ISSF rifle shooters
Place of birth missing